Huang Dongyan (born 14 December 1993) is a Chinese professional racing cyclist. She rides for China Chongming-Liv-Champion System Pro Cycling. She is from Shanghai. She also competed at the 2014 Asian Games.

Major results

2014
Asian Track Championships
1st  Scratch Race
1st  Team Pursuit (with Jiang Wenwen, Jing Yali and Zhao Baofang)
1st  Team Pursuit, Asian Games (with Jiang Wenwen, Jing Yali and Zhao Baofang)
3rd Omnium, China Track Cup
2015
1st  Team Pursuit, Asian Track Championships (with Jiang Wenwen, Jing Yali and Zhao Baofang)
2nd Omnium, China Track Cup
3rd Omnium, South Australian Grand Prix
2016
1st  Team Pursuit, Asian Track Championships (with Chen Lulu, Ma Menglu and Wang Hong)
2017
Asian Track Championships
1st  Team Pursuit (with Chen Qiaolin, Chen Siyu and Luo Xiaoling
3rd  Individual Pursuit
1st  Team Pursuit, National Track Championships (with Jing Yali, Ma Menglu and Wang Hong)

See also
 List of 2015 UCI Women's Teams and riders

References

External links
 Personal page at chinaprocycling.com
 

1993 births
Living people
Chinese female cyclists
Cyclists from Shanghai
Asian Games medalists in cycling
Cyclists at the 2014 Asian Games
Asian Games gold medalists for China
Medalists at the 2014 Asian Games
Olympic cyclists of China
Cyclists at the 2016 Summer Olympics
21st-century Chinese women